Jonathan Janil (born 24 September 1987) is a French professional ice hockey defenceman who plays for Boxers de Bordeaux in the Ligue Magnus. He played for France at the 2011 IIHF World Championship and the 2018 IIHF World Championship.

Janil's father is a native of Saint Pierre and Miquelon, and he still has family on the island whom he regularly visits.

References

External links

1987 births
Living people
Boxers de Bordeaux players
French ice hockey defencemen
Drakkars de Caen players
Rouen HE 76 players
Sportspeople from Caen